The Best of Jack Williamson is a collection of science fiction short stories by American author Jack Williamson. It was first published in paperback by Del Rey/Ballantine in June 1978 as a volume in its Classic Library of Science Fiction. It was reprinted by Del Rey Books in January 1984. The book has been translated into Italian and German.

Summary
The book contains fourteen short works of fiction and an afterword by the author, together with an introduction by Frederik Pohl.

Contents
"Jack Williamson: The Pathfinder" [introduction] (Frederik Pohl)
"The Metal Man" (from Amazing Stories, Dec. 1928)
"Dead Star Station" (from Astounding Stories, Nov. 1933)
"Nonstop to Mars" (from Argosy, Feb. 25, 1939)
"The Crucible of Power" (from Astounding Science-Fiction, Feb. 1939)
"Breakdown" (from Astounding Science-Fiction, Jan. 1942)
"With Folded Hands" (from Astounding Science Fiction, Jul. 1947)
"The Equalizer" (from Astounding Science Fiction, Mar. 1947)
"The Peddler's Nose" (from Astounding Science Fiction, Apr. 1951)
"The Happiest Creature" (from Star Science Fiction Stories no. 2, Dec. 1953)
"The Cold Green Eye" (from Fantastic, Mar./Apr. 1953)
"Operation: Gravity" (from Science-Fiction Plus, Oct. 1953)
"Guinevere for Everybody" (from Star Science Fiction Stories no. 3, Jan. 1955)
"Jamboree" (from Galaxy Magazine, Dec. 1969)
"The Highest Dive" (from Science Fiction Monthly, Jan. 1976)
"Afterword"

Reception
The book was reviewed by P. J. Stevens in Australian SF News, December 1978, Mark Mansell in Science Fiction Review, March 1979, and Michael Adrian in Friedhof der Roboter, 1981.

Awards
Williamson was nominated for the 2017 Prometheus Hall of Fame Award for "With Folded Hands," and won the award for 2018.

Notes

1978 short story collections
Science fiction short story collections
Del Rey books
Works by Jack Williamson